George Landon Browning (April 3, 1867 – August 26, 1947) was born in Rappahannock County, Virginia.  He was educated in the public schools of Rappahannock County and taught school there for several years.  Later, he attended Georgetown University, where he graduated with a Bachelor of Law degree.  Shortly thereafter, he took post-graduate work in law at the University of Virginia.  In 1899, he formed a partnership with James Hay and opened a law office at Madison Courthouse, Virginia.  This partnership ended when Judge Hay was made judge of the United States Court of Claims.  Judge Browning then moved his practice to Orange, Virginia, in 1909.  Here he practiced in partnership with several others until he was elected to the Supreme Court of Appeals on February 19, 1930.  In 1914, he had been elected to the Virginia House of Delegates from Orange County, Virginia and served there for two terms. Judge Browning was a member of the Supreme Court for seventeen years and six months until his death.

References

External links
 
 

1867 births
1947 deaths
Georgetown University Law Center alumni
Justices of the Supreme Court of Virginia
Virginia lawyers
People from Rappahannock County, Virginia
People from Madison, Virginia
People from Orange, Virginia